Forty Four is an unincorporated community in Izard County, Arkansas, United States.

The community was named for the 44 local signators who petitioned in order to secure the town a post office.

References

Unincorporated communities in Izard County, Arkansas
Unincorporated communities in Arkansas